Cyperus gymnocaulos, commonly known as spiny flatsedge, is a sedge of the family Cyperaceae that is native to  Australia.

Description
It blooms between July and March producing brown flowers. It normally has a short thick rhizome with smooth, trigonous and terete culms. The leaves are reduced to sheaths, except for juvenile plants.

C. gymnocaulos is usually smaller and less robust than C. vaginatus.

Taxonomy
The species was first formally described by the botanist Ernst Gottlieb von Steudel in 1854 as part of the work Synopsis Plantarum Glumacearum. Known synonyms include; Cyperus cruciformis and Cyperus vaginatus var. densiflorus. The name is commonly misapplied to Cyperus textilis.

Distribution
It is found in swamps and along creeks and rivers and other damp areas in all the states of mainland Australia as well as the Northern Territory. In Western Australia it is found in the Mid West, Wheatbelt, South West and Goldfields-Esperance regions where it grows in sandy-clay soils.

See also
List of Cyperus species

References

gymnocaulos
Plants described in 1854
Flora of Western Australia
Flora of South Australia
Flora of Queensland
Flora of New South Wales
Flora of Victoria (Australia)
Flora of the Northern Territory